Alexander Lewis (October 4, 1822 – April 18, 1908) was a wholesale goods, insurance, and real estate businessman and mayor of Detroit, Michigan.

Early life
Alexander Lewis was born on October 4, 1822, in Windsor, Ontario (then called "Sandwich"), the son of Thomas and Jeanette Velaire Lewis.  Alexander Lewis came to Detroit on May 1, 1837, to work as a clerk at E. W. Cole & Co.  He remained at E. W. Cole & Co. for two years, then spent two years at the druggists G. & J. G. Hill, and then moved to Pontiac, Michigan.  Lewis returned to Detroit in 1843 to start a forwarding and commission service with his brother Samuel and Horace Gray.  In 1845, Lewis started another forwarding and commission service with H. P. Bridge under the name of Bridge & Lewis.

Business and politics
Lewis remained with Bridge & Lewis until 1862, when he established a flour and grain business.  This he built into one of the largest and most prosperous enterprises in the city. Lewis retired in 1884 to look after his various property interests and real estate.  Lewis was also a director of the Detroit Fire & Marine Insurance Company, a director of the Detroit National Bank, president of Detroit Gas Light Company, and in 1862 president of the Detroit Board of Trade.

Lewis served as Police Commissioner from 1865 to 1875 and was elected mayor of Detroit in 1876 as a Democrat.  He was also a member of the Detroit Library Board of Commissioners from 1881 to 1888, and, with Thomas W. Palmer, established the Michigan Society for the Prevention of Cruelty to Animals.

Family and later life
Lewis married Elizabeth J. Ingersoll in 1850; the couple had 13 children, of which 8 lived into the 1890s: Ida Frances (Lewis) Healy, Edward L. Lewis, Josephine (Lewis) Carpenter, Hattie I. (Lewis) Currie, Harry B. Lewis, Julia Velaire (McMillan) Penrose, Marion Marie (Lewis) Muir, and Alexander Ingersoll Lewis. Through his daughter Julia, Alexander is the great-great-grandfather of Baroness Sybille de Selys Longchamps, the mother of Princess Delphine of Belgium (Delphine Michèle Anne Marie Ghislaine de Saxe-Cobourg; born 22 February 1968), known previously as Jonkvrouw Delphine Boël, is a Belgian artist and member of the Belgian royal family. She is the daughter of King Albert II of Belgium with Baroness Sybille de Selys Longchamps, and the half-sister of King Philippe of Belgium. Before 1 October 2020, she belonged to the Belgian titled nobility and was legally Jonkvrouw Boël. On that date, she was lawfully recognised as Princess of Belgium with the style "Her Royal Highness".

Around 1900, Lewis built a home in Grosse Pointe Farms, Michigan, which is now the parish house for the Saint Paul Catholic Church. The complex was designated a Michigan State Historic Site in 1992 Alexander Lewis died on April 18, 1908.

References

1822 births
1908 deaths
Businesspeople from Ontario
Mayors of Detroit
Politicians from Windsor, Ontario
19th-century American politicians